Daniel Connor (1831–12 January 1898) was an Irish convict transported to the colony in western Australia, who would go on to become one of the wealthiest, and most successful men in the region.

Daniel Connor was born in County Kerry, Ireland in 1831. Nothing is known of his early life, but on 20 June 1850, he was sentenced to seven years' transportation for sheep stealing. During his time as a convict he went by the surname Connors; Stephenson (1983) states that this was "to confuse researchers of his history in later years". Connor received his ticket of leave on 11 August 1854 and his conditional pardon on 17 November 1855. In 1859, he married Catherine Conway (1835 - 1916).

Connor worked as a hawker until 1861, then bought land in Newcastle (now Toodyay), upon which he built a small store.  He later purchased a number of other town lots and built upon a number of them.  In 1870, he had a steam mill built, and over the next decade gained control over a number of large rural estates by lending money to the owners.  He purchased the Freemason's Hotel in 1873.

Connor became active in public affairs; he was a member (and chairman in 1880) of the Toodyay Road Board from 1871 until his death in 1898.  He was also a member of the Newcastle Municipal Council and served on the Toodyay Education Board.

During the 1880s, Connor sold many of his Newcastle properties and invested in land at Perth and Fremantle.  In 1883, he bought the Shamrock Hotel.  Later that year, his daughter Teresa married Timothy Quinlan, and Connor and Quinlan went into partnership.  By the 1890s, Connor was one of the largest landowners in central Perth.  When he died at his home on 12 January 1898, his estate was valued at over £76000.

Connor's eldest son, Michael, who took the surname "O'Connor", presumably to obscure his convict parentage, became a Member of the Western Australian Legislative Assembly.

Family 
Daniel Connor fathered seven children by Catherine Conway:

 Teresa, (1863–1904), married Timothy Quinlan, born 18 February 1861 (Borrisokane Co Tipperary Ireland) died 8 July 1927, children: Teresa Gertrude, Daniel Alphonsus O'Connor born 16 February 1902, Eileen Mary, Mary Kathleen, and Patrick;
 Michael, (1865–1940), married on 17 July 1896 to Beatrice Margaret Forbes born 20 June 1871, daughter of Col. Charles D'Oyley and Mary Louise (née Slade), children: Leo born 1889. Sent to Clongowes Wood Jesuit College, County Kildare, then studied medicine at Trinity College, Dublin graduating in 1889, BA, MD, B.Ch. BAO. Returned to Western Australia in 1890 and a practice in Perth 1891.  Appointed a health officer during smallpox outbreak until resignation 1907.  Senior Physician Perth Public Hospital and Victoria Hospital, Subiaco. Chairman of Directors of Swan Brewery.  Member Legislative Council for Moore district. Adopted the surname "O'Connor".
 Daniel Edward, (1866–1928). Educated at Clongowes Wood Jesuit College, County Kildare, then studied medicine at Trinity College, Dublin, and was the first native born West Australian to qualify as a medical doctor. Married on 26 July 1891 to Elizabeth Jane Clune (1896–1902), children: Daniel Ignatius (1892–1967), Francis Xavier Aloys (1894–1941), Mary Patricia (1896–1918), Clement Augustine (1898–1917), Vincent Jeramiah (1900–1975);
 Gertrude Blanche (1867–1878);
 Monica, (1868–1958), married 1902 to Edward Joseph Hayes (1870–1929), children: Edward Daniel (1910–1879), Sheila Amorey Catherine, Eileen Mary Monica (1904–1987), Dorothea Mary Catherine;
 Bernard Maurice, (1870–1932), married Teresa Jane Murphy, Children: Gerard Daniel Joseph O'Connor (1910–1993), Edward Desmond O'Connor (1912–2000), Arthur Patrick Kevin O'Connor (1912–1943), Maurice Bernard O'Connor; Mayor of Newcastle; Member of Board of Health 1901; Invested in Eureka Mine, Blackboy Hill goldfield; A founding member of Toodyay Club 1905; J.P.; Educ. Toodyay and Ireland. Adopted the surname "O'Connor".
 Mary Angela, (1873–1948), married John Murphy. Children: Stanislaus (1906–1969).

References 

 

1831 births
1898 deaths
Convicts transported to Western Australia
Western Australian local councillors
People from County Kerry
Irish emigrants to colonial Australia
People from Toodyay, Western Australia
19th-century Australian politicians